The Music Goes 'Round is a 1936 American musical comedy film directed by Victor Schertzinger and starring Harry Richman, Rochelle Hudson and Walter Connolly.

Plot

Partial cast

References

Bibliography
 James Monaco. The Encyclopedia of Film. Perigee Books, 1991.

External links
 

1936 films
1936 musical comedy films
American musical comedy films
Films directed by Victor Schertzinger
Films with screenplays by Jo Swerling
Columbia Pictures films
American black-and-white films
1930s English-language films
1930s American films